Hadi Saleh (1949 - January 4, 2005) was an Iraqi trade unionist and was International Secretary of the Iraqi Federation of Trade Unions.

Saleh had been involved in Iraqi trade unions for much of his adult life, and was sentenced to death in 1969 because of his involvement in independent unions after the 1968 Ba'ath coup. He served five years in jail before the sentence was commuted, and he fled to Sweden, where he lived as a refugee until after the 2003 invasion of Iraq.

While in Sweden, Saleh helped form the Workers' Democratic Trade Union Movement, an underground organization in Iraq.

Following his return to Iraq, he helped found the Iraqi Federation of Trade Unions in May 2003, and was elected onto its executive committee.

On January 4, 2005, his Baghdad home was broken into, and he was tortured and killed by Iraqi insurgents. It has been suggested that the killing bore the hallmarks of an action by the former Iraqi security services, and that it was intended to undermine the growth of the Iraqi trade union movement.

External links 
 A leading Iraqi trade unionist, 'The Guardian', 20 January 2005
 He encouraged trade unions in his country, 'The Times', 8 February 2005
IFTU archive of reports on Hadi Saleh's death

1949 births
2005 deaths
2005 murders in Iraq
Assassinated Iraqi politicians
People murdered in Iraq
Iraqi trade unionists
Iraqi prisoners sentenced to death
Prisoners sentenced to death by Iraq
Iraqi refugees
Refugees in Sweden